The Book of Us: Gluon – Nothing Can Tear Us Apart, often shortened to The Book of Us: Gluon, is the first extended play by South Korean band Day6 (Even of Day), a sub-unit of Day6 consisting of members Young K, Wonpil, and Dowoon. It was released by JYP Entertainment on August 31, 2020. The album contains seven tracks co-written by Young K and Wonpil, including the lead single, "Where the Sea Sleeps".

Background and release 
On August 6, 2020, Day6's first sub-unit Day6 (Even of Day) was announced. On August 28, an album sampler was released revealing the track list of The Book of Us: Gluon, constituted of seven songs. The EP was released on August 31, 2020. Multiple songs are stated to have collaborations with "Denimalz 3", which Denimalz is a line of Day6 plush merchandise, with Denimalz 3 representing the 3 members present in the subunit. Denimalz 3 act as the main protagonists in the "Where the Sea Sleeps" official music video.

Promotion 
On September 3, the subunit held their debut stage on Mnet's M Countdown and promoted "Where the Sea Sleeps" on several music programs in South Korea, including Music Bank, Show! Music Core and Inkigayo.

Track listing 
The credits are Available on the official album profile on Naver

Charts

Album

Songs

Notes

References 

JYP Entertainment EPs
Day6 EPs
Korean-language EPs
2020 EPs